James Dillon, 1st Earl of Roscommon (died March 1641) fought for the crown in the Nine Years' War. He was ennobled despite being a Catholic after his son Robert turned Protestant.

Birth and origins 

James was born in Ireland, the eldest son of Lucas Dillon ( – 1593) and his first wife Jane Bathe. At the time of his birth, his father was a lawyer but would later become a judge and finish his career as Chief Baron of the Irish Exchequer. His father's family was Old English and descended from Sir Henry Dillon who came to Ireland with Prince John in 1185 during the Anglo-Norman invasion of Ireland. His family held substantial lands in Meath, Westmeath, Longford, and Roscommon.

James's mother was a daughter of James Bathe (c. 1500 – 1570), who preceded James's father as chief baron of the Irish Exchequer. She was James's father's first wife. His father's second marriage was childless. James was one of 12 siblings, who are listed in his father's article.

Stepmother 
Dillon's father remarried in 1575 to Marion Barnewall, née Sharl (or Sherle), the widow of Sir Christopher Barnewall (1522–1575) of Turvey House, Dublin. Marion, his stepmother, had 15 children from her first marriage, among them Eleanor with whom James fell in love.

Marriage and children 
Dillon married Eleanor Barnewall, also called Helen, his step-sister through his father's second marriage. She was a daughter of Sir Christopher Barnewall of Turvey.

 
James and Eleanor had 13 children, seven sons:
 Robert (died 1642) became the 2nd Earl
 Lucas of Twomere, or of Trinity Island, County Cavan, from whom the 9th, 10th and 11th earls descended, married Mary, daughter of Sir John Thorpe
 Thomas, died childless
 Christopher, died childless
 George, died childless
 John, died childless
 Patrick, from whom the 12th and last Earl descended, married Jane Malone, daughter of Edmund Malone

—and six daughters:
 Jane, married in 1604 her distant cousin Sir Christopher Dillon, son of Theobald Dillon, 1st Viscount Dillon
 Elizabeth, married Hussey, Baron Galtrim
 Frances, married the playwright and politician Henry Burnell and had many children, including the poet Eleanor Burnell
 Margaret, married a Nugent of Drumcree
 Mary, married sir John Bellew
 Alison, married Roger O'Farrell of Morrin, chief of his name

Later life, death, and timeline 
Dillon's father died in February 1593 in Dublin. There must have been some complications with the inheritance as Dillon obtained special livery of his inheritance in 1595 when he was about 30.

In 1599, during the Nine Years' War (1593–1603), Dillon raised a troop of 25 horse loyal to Elizabeth I at his own expense, to help keep order in County Roscommon. Dillon was knighted, probably by the new Lord Deputy Mountjoy in November 1600.

His eldest son, Robert, the future 2nd earl, and his grandson James, the future 3rd earl, were both raised as Catholics but conformed to the established religion, while Dillon himself stayed Catholic. Robert converted before 1619. James, born in 1605, was at a young age converted by James Ussher, Archbishop of Armagh.

On 24 January 1620 Dillon was raised to the peerage with the title of Baron Dillon of Kilkenny-West, in the Peerage of Ireland. This elevation was announced in a ceremony performed by the chief governor of Ireland, Lord Deputy Oliver St. John, in the Presence Chamber of Dublin Castle on 25 January.

On 5 August 1622 Lord Kilkenny-West was advanced to the dignity of Earl of Roscommon. His baronial dignity became a subsidiary title, which he gave as a courtesy title to his heir apparent as is the custom. His eldest son Robert, therefore, was styled Lord Kilkenny-West from 1622 on.

Lord Roscommon was a signatory of a response to Charles I from the Lords of the Pale  that established a military force to protect The Crown's interests in Ireland. In 1627, he was a Commissioner for raising money for the King's Army in Meath, Westmeath and Longford. 

His wife predeceased him on 11 October 1628.

On 14 July 1634, Lord Roscommon took his seat in the Irish House of Lords. This was the first Irish Parliament called by King Charles I.

He died in March 1641 and was succeeded in his titles by his eldest son, Robert as the 2nd Earl of Roscommon.

Notes and references

Notes

Citations

Sources 

 
  – 1221 to 1690
 
 
 
 
  – N to R (for Roscommon)
  (for his father)
  – Scotland and Ireland
  – (for timeline)
  – Viscounts (for Dillon)
  – Knights bachelors & Index
 
 

 

1641 deaths
16th-century Irish people
17th-century Irish people
Earls of Roscommon
Peers of Ireland created by James I
People of Elizabethan Ireland
Year of birth uncertain